Desulfomonile tiedjei is a bacterium. It is anaerobic, dehalogenating, sulfate-reducing, Gram-negative, non-motile, non-spore-forming and rod-shaped. Its type strain is DCB-1.

References

Further reading
Louie, Tai Man, and William W. Mohn. "Evidence for a Chemiosmotic Model of Dehalorespiration in Desulfomonile tiedjeiDCB-1." Journal of Bacteriology 181.1 (1999): 40–46.

External links

LPSN
Type strain of Desulfomonile tiedjei at BacDive -  the Bacterial Diversity Metadatabase

Bacteria described in 1990
Thermodesulfobacteriota